Simplice Yaméogo (born 22 September 1988) is a retired Burkinabé football striker.

References

1988 births
Living people
Burkinabé footballers
Burkina Faso international footballers
US Ouagadougou players
Rail Club du Kadiogo players
ASFA Yennenga players
Association football forwards
21st-century Burkinabé people